Lanny Marshall Broyles (born February 25, 1949) is a Tokyo-based American voice actor and choreographer.

Career 
A graduate of the University of Southern California with a major in "Speech", "Theater" and "English Literature", Broyles appeared in supporting roles in various early 1980s films; most notably Roger Corman's Battle Beyond the Stars.

Wishing to live in a foreign country, Broyles moved to Japan in the 1980s, where he did dubbing work for Frontier Enterprises. He currently works as an English-teacher at the Waseda College of International Language Vocational School.

Filmography

Dubbing

Anime films 
 Cyborg 009: The Legend of the Super Galaxy (1980) – Commander Garro
 Arcadia of My Youth (1982) – Captain Harlock, Phantom F. Harlock I
 The Dagger of Kamui (1985) – Genjuro Fujibayashi

Video games 
 Ys III: Wanderers from Ys (1991) – Jetai

References 
  Content in this article was copied from Lanny Broyles at Dubbing Wikia, which is licensed under the Creative Commons Attribution-Share Alike 3.0 (Unported) (CC-BY-SA 3.0) license.

External links 
 
 

1949 births
American expatriates in Japan
American male video game actors
American male voice actors
Living people
Teachers of English as a second or foreign language
20th-century American male actors